Colegio Hebreo Sefaradí A.C. (CHS; Hebrew: בית הספר העברי ספרדי) is a Jewish private school in Lomas del Chamizal, Cuajimalpa, Mexico City.
 
It serves levels from Kindergarten through Bachillerato (senior high school diploma).

The campus has  of space.

References

External links
 Colegio Hebreo Sefaradí
 Colegio Hebreo Sefaradí (Archive)

Jewish schools in Mexico
Jews and Judaism in Mexico City
High schools in Mexico City
Cuajimalpa
Private schools in Mexico
Sephardi Jewish culture in Mexico